Christoph von Dohnányi (born 8 September 1929) is a German conductor.

Biography

Youth and World War II 
Dohnányi was born in Berlin, Germany to Hans von Dohnanyi, a German jurist of Hungarian ancestry, and Christine Bonhoeffer. His uncle on his mother's side, and also his godfather, was Dietrich Bonhoeffer, a Lutheran pastor and theologian/ethicist. His grandfather was the pianist and composer Ernő Dohnányi, also known as Ernst von Dohnányi. His father, uncle and other family members participated  in the German Resistance movement against Nazism, and were arrested and detained in several Nazi concentration camps before being executed in 1945, when Christoph was 15 years old. Dohnányi's older brother is Klaus von Dohnanyi, a German politician and former mayor of Hamburg.

Education and early engagements
After World War II, Dohnányi studied law in Munich, but in 1948 he transferred to the Hochschule für Musik und Theater München to study composition, piano and conducting. At the opera in Munich, he was a stage extra, coached singers, and was a house pianist. He received the Richard Strauss Prize from the city of Munich, and then went to Florida State University to study with his grandfather.

His first position as assistant was at the Oper Frankfurt, appointed by Georg Solti, where he also served as a ballet and opera coach. He was general musical director of the Lübeck Opera from 1957 to 1963, then Germany's youngest GMD. He also served as chief conductor of the Staatsorchester Kassel. He also served as chief conductor of the WDR Symphony Orchestra Cologne. In 1968, he succeeded Lovro von Matačić who had succeeded Georg Solti as general music director and Dohnányi later became also musical director at the Oper Frankfurt and served in both capacities until 1977. He took the positions of intendant and chief conductor with the Hamburg State Opera in 1977, and relinquished those posts in 1984.

As director of the Oper Frankfurt and with his team including Gerard Mortier (Director of Théâtre de la Monnaie, Brussels, Salzburg Festival, Opéra de Paris), Peter Mario Katona (Director of Casting at ROH Covent Garden) and Klaus Schultz, Dramaturg in Munich (Bayerische Staatsoper) and Berlin (Philharmonic Orchestra), then General Manager of the Stadttheater Aachen, Nationaltheater Mannheim, and Gärtnerplatztheater in Munich, the balance in programming of traditional opera performance and innovative Musiktheater, promoting the idea of Regietheater, established the Oper Frankfurt as a leading house at that time. He continued this concept in Hamburg.

Cleveland years
Christoph von Dohnányi made his conducting debut with The Cleveland Orchestra in December 1981 and was named “Music Director Designate” the following year. However, he would not begin his tenure as music director until 1984. During the intervening two years, the Orchestra invited a number of guest conductors to lead the ensemble, including former music director Erich Leinsdorf for six weeks of subscription concerts. Leinsdorf would remark that he was the "bridge between the regimes." Before taking the podium as the Orchestra’s sixth music director, Dohnányi made guest appearances with other American orchestras, including those in Detroit, Pittsburgh, and New York, as well as leading The Cleveland Orchestra in its annual gala concert and recordings at Severance Hall. As Dohnányi began his first season as music director, he brought with him contacts that would push the Orchestra forward with a variety of recording projects. Near the end of the 1984-85 season, Dohnányi announced an ambitious idea: The Cleveland Orchestra would use its summer home, Blossom Music Center, to perform a fully-staged opera: Mozart's The Magic Flute. The production, which was attended by 15,000 people, was labeled "the Ohio musical event of the summer" by The Columbus Dispatch. Dohnányi also oversaw the hiring of Indonesian-born conductor Jahja Ling, who would lead the newly-established Cleveland Orchestra Youth Orchestra, which had its first concert in February 1987.

In addition to making recording a hallmark of his tenure as music director through the Orchestra's ongoing association with several labels (Teldec, Decca/London, and Telarc), Dohnányi focused much of his attention on international touring. In 1986, the Orchestra embarked on its sixth tour of Europe and its first international tour under Dohnányi, performing twenty-one concerts in seventeen cities across Western Europe. Not only would the Orchestra continue with international touring to Europe or East Asia nearly every season, it would also embark on tours of European festivals, including the Salzburg Festival, where the Orchestra’s long-standing relationship would begin after a performance in 1990. Because of the departure or retirement of several musicians between 1988 and 1990, Dohnányi was tasked with hiring new Orchestra members, including a replacement for Robert Page, who had been the longtime director of the Cleveland Orchestra Chorus. Furthermore, Leonard Slatkin, the former music director of the St. Louis Symphony, was appointed Blossom Festival Director beginning in the summer of 1991.

To celebrate The Cleveland Orchestra’s 75th anniversary, Dohnányi led performances of Richard Wagner’s Ring cycle at Severance Hall during the 1992–93 and 1993-94 seasons. Although the ensemble’s intention was to become the first symphony orchestra in the United States to record the four-opera, fifteen-hour musical monument, financial restrictions limited the Orchestra to recording only the first two operas — Das Rheingold and Die Walküre.

In 1992, Dohnányi signed a new contract that extended his tenure as music director through the 1999-2000 season. A few years later, the Orchestra began a fundraising campaign for the renovation of Severance Hall, which included the removal of the “Szell Shell,” a return of the E.M. Skinner organ to the stage, and an expansion of internal facilities to enhance the experience of concertgoers. Dohnányi signed his final contract as music director with the Orchestra in 1997, extending his tenure until 2002.

As international touring continued, the Orchestra visited the People’s Republic of China for the first time in 1998. During the spring of 1999, the Orchestra moved to Cleveland’s Playhouse Square for a residency at the Allen Theatre until the renovation of Severance Hall was completed. On January 8, 2000, Dohnányi led a gala concert to celebrate the re-opening of Severance Hall, which was broadcast live on local television by Cleveland’s WVIZ. Dohnányi finished out his contract — eventually succeeded by Franz Welser-Möst in 2002 — and was named Music Director Laureate of The Cleveland Orchestra.

After Cleveland 
In 1994, Dohnányi became the principal guest conductor of London's Philharmonia Orchestra, and in 1997 their Principal Conductor. In April 2007, Dohnányi was one of eight conductors of British orchestras to endorse the 10-year classical music outreach manifesto, "Building on Excellence: Orchestras for the 21st Century", to increase the presence of classical music in the UK, including giving free entry to all British schoolchildren to a classical music concert. In 2008, he stepped down from the Philharmonia principal conductorship and now holds the title with the orchestra of "Honorary Conductor for Life".

After retiring as music director of the Cleveland Orchestra, Dohnányi has been a guest conductor with the Boston Symphony, New York Philharmonic, Philadelphia Orchestra, Pittsburgh Symphony, Chicago Symphony and Los Angeles Philharmonic, as well as the Cleveland Orchestra. He has performed frequently at the Tanglewood Music Festival with the Boston Symphony Orchestra. A regular collaboration has developed with the Israel Philharmonic Orchestra since the 1990s.

In 2004, Dohnányi returned to Hamburg, Germany where he maintained a residence for many years, to become chief conductor of the NDR Symphony Orchestra. He concluded his NDR tenure after the 2009-2010 season. He has been a frequent guest conductor in concert with the Vienna Philharmonic and at the Vienna State Opera.

With the Philharmonia Orchestra, Dohnányi performed throughout Europe at such venues as the Musikverein in Vienna, the Salzburg Festival, Amsterdam's Concertgebouw, the Lucerne Festival, and Paris's Théâtre des Champs Elysées. For several seasons, Dohnányi and the Philharmonia Orchestra were in residence at the Théâtre du Châtelet in Paris, performing new productions of Richard Strauss's operas Arabella, Die Frau ohne Schatten and Die schweigsame Frau, Arnold Schoenberg's Moses und Aron, Igor Stravinsky's Oedipus Rex and Engelbert Humperdinck's Hänsel und Gretel. At the Opernhaus Zürich, Dohnányi led new productions of Moses and Aron, Oedipus Rex (with  Béla Bartók's Bluebeard's Castle),  Strauss's Die Schweigsame Frau, Ariadne auf Naxos, Salome, Elektra, and Die Frau ohne Schatten, Mozart's Idomeneo, Giuseppe Verdi's Un Ballo in Maschera, and Richard Wagner's The Flying Dutchman.

Assistants to Christoph von Dohnányi 
Michael Stern, music director and lead conductor of the Kansas City Symphony, was assistant conductor to Dohnányi from 1986 to 1991 at the Cleveland Orchestra.
Alan Gilbert, former music director of the New York Philharmonic, was assistant conductor to Dohnányi from 1995 to 1997 at the Cleveland Orchestra. Alejo Pérez was assistant conductor at the NDR Symphony Orchestra from 2005 to 2007 and Jens Georg Bachmann, Artistic Director and Chief Conductor of the Cyprus Symphony Orchestra  was in the same position at the NDR Symphony Orchestra from 2007 to 2009.

Family 
Dohnányi was married to the German actress Renate Zillessen; they had two children, Katja and Justus. His second wife was the German soprano Anja Silja, with whom he had three children: Julia, Benedikt and Olga. Since 2004 Dohnányi has been married to Barbara Koller.

References

Sources
 
 Klaus Schultz (ed.), Offen sein zu - hören. Der Dirigent Christoph von Dohnányi. Hamburg: Murmann 2010, 281 p.  [The book contains a discography.]

External links
 http://christophvondohnanyi.com
 
 Christoph von Dohnányi biography at the Philharmonia
 Christoph von Dohnányi biography at the Cleveland Orchestra
 Colbert Artists Management Inc.
 Interview with Christoph von Dohnányi, February 9, 2005

1929 births
Commanders Crosses of the Order of Merit of the Federal Republic of Germany
Christoph von Dohnanyi
German male conductors (music)
German people of Hungarian descent
University of Music and Performing Arts Munich alumni
Male conductors (music)
Living people
Musicians from Shaker Heights, Ohio
21st-century German conductors (music)
21st-century German male musicians
21st-century American male musicians
People from Berlin
People from Steglitz-Zehlendorf